Pont de Vieille-Brioude (Vieille-Brioude Bridge) is located in France, crossing the river Allier. It is a masonry arch bridge with a span of  that was built in 1832.

The bridge was ordered by local resident Lady de Dombes and built by Grenier and Estone similar to how Pont Grand (Tournon-sur-Rhône) was later built. The completion of the bridge was delayed for years because of some controversy. The bridge was too narrow, and its approaches were too steep to be used by carts. It collapsed on March 27, 1822, at 6 am.

Before any stone bridge had been built on this site, there was a wooden bridge.

See also 
 List of bridges in France
 List of medieval bridges in France
Other very large medieval bridges
 Puente del Diablo (Martorell) (37.3 m span)
 Ponte della Maddalena (37.8 m span)
 Puente de San Martín (Toledo) (40 m span)
 Nyons Bridge (40.53 m span)
 Pont du Diable (Céret) (45.45 m span)
 Castelvecchio Bridge (48.70 m span)
 Pont Grand (Tournon-sur-Rhône) (49.20 m span)
 Trezzo sull'Adda Bridge (72 m span)

Notes 

Deck arch bridges
Bridges in France
Stone bridges in France